The Aerolab LoCamp is an Italian amateur-built aircraft, designed and originally produced by Aerolab SRL of Gallarate. The aircraft is supplied as a kit for amateur construction, although the company plans to also certify the aircraft to JAR-VLA as well as produce a light-sport aircraft category version.

The LoCamp design is now produced by one of Aerolab's original dealers, Golden Age Aeroworks, LLC of Richland Center, Wisconsin, United States.

Design and development
The LoCamp is intended to resemble a 1930s style light aircraft. It features a cantilever low-wing, a two-seats-in-tandem open cockpit with polycarbonate windscreens, fixed conventional landing gear and a single engine in tractor configuration.

The aircraft fuselage is made from welded steel tubing, with the wing built from wood or optionally aluminum sheet and its flying surfaces covered in doped aircraft fabric. The standard engine available is the  Rotec R2800 four-stroke radial engine, although the  Walter Mikron MIIIC was under evaluation by the manufacturer.

In 2015 the manufacturer was considering producing a fully assembled special light-sport aircraft version.

Variants
LoCamp
Low wing monoplane model
HiCamp
Parasol wing model, that uses the same fuselage as the LoCamp model
BiCamp
Biplane model, that uses the same fuselage as the LoCamp model

Specifications (LoCamp)

References

External links

Homebuilt aircraft
Single-engined tractor aircraft